The Simpsons is an American animated television sitcom created by Matt Groening for the Fox Broadcasting Company. The series is a satirical parody of a middle class American lifestyle epitomized by its eponymous family, which consists of Homer, Marge, Bart, Lisa and Maggie. It is set in the fictional town of Springfield, and lampoons American culture, society and television, and many aspects of the human condition. The family was conceived by Groening shortly before a pitch for a series of animated shorts with producer James L. Brooks. Groening created a dysfunctional family and named the characters after members of his own family, substituting Bart for his own name. The shorts became a part of The Tracey Ullman Show on April 19, 1987 and after a three-season run, the sketch was developed into a half-hour prime time show and became a hit series for Fox. The growing popularity of the series motivated video game developers to create video games based on the series. Two pinball machines have also been produced; one self-titled, that was only made available for a limited time after the first season finale (1990) and The Simpsons Pinball Party (2003). Additionally, several handheld device games have been released, such as Bartman: Avenger of Evil (1990) and Bart Simpson's Cupcake Crisis (1991).

Video games based on the series have reached multiple platforms since their debut in 1991. The Simpsons''' first video game release, The Simpsons, developed and published by Konami, saw a release on the Commodore 64 and DOS, while Bart vs. the Space Mutants (1991), developed by Imagineering, expanded the franchise into new platforms, including the Amstrad CPC, NES and Master System. Over the next few years, the franchise would continue to expand, releasing system-exclusive games, such as the PC's Cartoon Studio (1996) and the PlayStation's The Simpsons Wrestling (2001). The release of The Simpsons Game (2007), developed by EA Redwood Shores (Visceral Games), further expanded the franchise, appearing on new platforms including the Wii, Xbox 360 and PlayStation 3. Due to the series' longevity, The Simpsons video games have also spanned across many genres, such as the puzzle game Krusty's Fun House (1992), the sports game Itchy & Scratchy in Miniature Golf Madness (1994) and racing game Road Rage (2001). The Simpsons is also one of the franchises spotlighted in the toys-to-life video game Lego Dimensions (2015).

Video games
, 27video games focused on The Simpsons'' series have been released. The following table showcases the correspondent title, release date, publisher, developer and the platforms on which each game was released along with any other relevant information. A detailed overview of each game can be found in their corresponding articles, with the exception of games without articles, which instead have a brief overview in a footnote.

See also
List of video game franchises

Notes

References

Electronic Arts franchises
Konami franchises
Video Games
 
Lists of video games by franchise